Cucalón is a municipality located in the province of Teruel, Aragon, Spain. According to the 2010 census the municipality has a population of 102 inhabitants. This town gives its name to the Sierra de Cucalón system of mountain ranges.

There are ruins of an ancient Iberian settlement, known as Peña el Castillo, located within Cucalón's municipal term.

Gallery

See also
Jiloca Comarca
List of municipalities in Teruel

References

External links 

Cucalón, Jiloca
Cucalón
Sierra de Cucalón
Guía general de las sierras de Cucalón, Oriche y Fonfría

Municipalities in the Province of Teruel